The Eye of the Tyger is an original novella written by Paul J. McAuley and based on the long-running British science fiction television series Doctor Who.  It features the Eighth Doctor. It was released as a standard edition hardback, a deluxe edition featuring a frontispiece by Jim Burns, and also a Special Deluxe Edition (limited to only 40 copies). All editions have a foreword by Neil Gaiman.

External links
The Cloister Library - The Eye of the Tyger

Reviews
The Eye of the Tyger reviews at Infinity Plus

2003 British novels
2003 science fiction novels
Doctor Who novellas
Eighth Doctor novels
British science fiction novels
Telos Publishing books
Works by Paul J. McAuley